Hussein Jabbar Abbood Al Majidi (born 9 March 1998), is an Iraqi professional footballer who plays as a left winger for Al-Quwa Al-Jawiya and the Iraq national team.

Club career
Jabbar played for Al-Karkh until 2019. Then he moved to Al-Quwa Al-Jawiya and played in the 2021 AFC Champions League.

International career
Jabbar was called up for Iraq U23 in the 2020 AFC U-23 Championship. 

Jabbar made his debut with the Iraq national team for the first time in the friendly against Uganda.

Honours

Club
Al-Quwa Al-Jawiya
 Iraqi Premier League: 2020–21
 Iraq FA Cup: 2020–21

International
Iraq
 Arabian Gulf Cup: 2023

References

Living people
1998 births
Iraqi footballers
Association football midfielders